Timo Saarnio (born 1944) is a Finnish interior architect and furniture designer.

Early life and education
Timo Saarnio was born in 1944 in Helsinki, Finland. He completed training as an Interior Architect, SIO (Institute for Applied Arts, now University of Art and Design Helsinki) in 1971.

Career
Saarnio established his own design firm in 1982. He became a freelance furniture designer in 1992, has taught at the University of Art and Design, Helsinki, and has held elected positions in SIO and ORNAMO, the Finnish Association of Designers.

Exhibitions
2004 - Chairmania Exhibition (Tokyo, Helsinki, Tallinn)

Awards
1990 State Industrial Design Award
1996 Roter Punkt (Red Dot Award), Germany (Una chair)
1996 1st prize, Forsnäs 100 Years Competition, Sweden (Duetto chair)
1996 Gold Prize, International Furniture Design Competition, Ashikawa, Japan (Woody chair)
1997 Three year State artist's grant
1998 Chair of the Year, Udine, Italy (Pack chair)
1999 SIO Furniture Award at the Habitare fair in Helsinki (Chip chair)
2007 7th Andreu World International Design Competition

References

1944 births
Living people
Architects from Helsinki
Finnish furniture designers